Upper Bridge may refer to:

in Slovenia
 Cobblers' Bridge, also known as Shoemakers' Bridge or Upper Bridge crossing the river Ljubljanica in Ljubljana, the capital of Slovenia

in the United States
Upper Bridge (Warsaw, Missouri), listed on the NRHP in Missouri